Florida's first aeronautical event occurred on January 28, 1878, when a balloon flew over Jacksonville. Florida hosted the first airline flight on New Year's Day 1914.

Events 
January 1914 - St. Petersburg-Tampa Airboat Line becomes the first airline in the world using heavier-than-air vehicles.
December 1916 - Navy takes delivery of its first airship, the DN-1
April 1, 1926 - Florida Airways starts Commercial Air Mail (CAM) Service.
Sun 'n Fun air show started in 1974.

Aircraft manufacturers 
Comp Air - Merritt Island, Florida
Piper Aircraft - Vero Beach
Progressive Aerodyne - Tavares, Florida

Aerospace 
Florida Institute of Technology
Embry–Riddle Aeronautical University

Airports 
 List of airports in Florida

Commercial service 
Air Florida based in Florida from 1971 to 1984
Red Arrow Flying Service - Chalk's Ocean Airways - Chalk's International Airlines founded in Miami in 1917.
National Airlines founded in 1934.

Organizations 
Florida Aviation Association - Founded in 1936 in Orlando
Space Florida

Government and military
Florida Department of Transportation 
The National Oceanic and Atmospheric Administration bases its aircraft at the Aircraft Operations Center in Lakeland.

Museums 
 Air Force Armament Museum, Valparaiso, Florida
 Air Force Space and Missile Museum, Cape Canaveral Space Force Station
 Airport Museum (Melbourne, Florida)
 DeLand Naval Air Station Museum, DeLand, Florida
 Fantasy of Flight, Polk City, Florida
 Florida Air Museum, Lakeland, Florida
 Kennedy Space Center Visitor Complex, Merritt Island, Florida
 Kissimmee Air Museum
 National Naval Aviation Museum, Pensacola, Florida
 United States Astronaut Hall of Fame, south of Titusville, Florida
 US Space Walk of Fame, Titusville, Florida
 Valiant Air Command Warbird Museum, Titusville, Florida
 Wings of Dreams Aviation Museum, Keystone Heights, Florida
 Wings Over Miami, Tamiami Airport, Miami

References 

 
Transportation in Florida